Wildwood Middle High School is located in Wildwood, Florida. The school is the 6-12 school for the Sumter District Schools.

Demographics
The demographic breakdown of the 764 students enrolled in Fall 2019-2020 per Florida DOE was:
Male - 51.3%
Female - 48.7%
Black - 37.3%
Hispanic - 17%
White - 40.6%
Multiracial - 3.9%
Sub-Groups - 1.2%
Economically Disadvantaged - 84.8%
Students with Disabilities - 19.6%

84.8% of the students were eligible for free or reduced lunch.

References

External links

Educational institutions in the United States with year of establishment missing
Public high schools in Florida
Public middle schools in Florida
Schools in Sumter County, Florida